MA'ADEN (Saudi Arabian Mining Co.) is a Saudi state-owned mining company headquartered in Riyadh. It was formed as a Saudi joint stock company on 23 March 1997 for the purpose of facilitating the development of Saudi Arabia's mineral resources. The Saudi government still owns 50% of its shares while the remaining 50% are listed in Tadawul (Stock Market).  It is the largest mining company in Saudi Arabia.

Corporate and subsidiaries

On 20 December 2009, Ma'aden signed an agreement with US aluminium giant Alcoa to build a $10.8 billion aluminium complex. Under the agreement, the two firms will build a 1.8 million tonnes per year aluminium refinery and a 750,000 tonnes per year smelter in Ras Al-Zour. The smelter is slated to start production in 2013 while the refinery would come online in 2014.

The company was primarily focused on developing the Kingdom's gold mining operations. Ras Al-Khair's complex includes a diammonium phosphate plant, an alumina refinery, smelter and rolling mill associated with the Alco joint venture, and links by rail to the phosphate mine in Waad Al-Shamal.

Ma'aden Corporate (HQ): Based in Riyadh.
Ma'aden Gold Company: based in Jeddah, Gold and base metals.
Ma'aden Phosphate Company: based in Ras Al-Khair, phosphate industry, with joint venture partner SABIC.
Ma'aden Aluminum Company: based in Ras Al-Khair, aluminum industry, with joint venture partner Alcoa.
Ma'aden Rolling Company
Ma'aden Smelter Company
Ma'aden Mining and Refinery Company
Ma'aden Infrastructures Company: based in Ras Al-Khair, Housing.
Ma'aden Industrial Minerals Company: Based in Jeddah.
Magnesite Projects: Based in Medina
Zinc and Copper Projects

Ma'aden projects
Ma'aden's projects are currently developing or operating at the following sites in Saudi Arabia:

Al Jalamid - The Phosphate Project

Ras AZ-Zour (Ras Al Khair) - The Phosphate and Aluminium Projects

Az Zabirah - The Aluminium and Industrial Minerals Projects

Zarghat - Industrial Minerals Project

Mahd ad Dahab - Gold and Base Metals

Sukhaybarat - Gold and Base Metals

Bulghah - Gold and Base Metals

Al Hajar - Gold and Base Metals

As Suoq - Gold and Base Metals

Ad Duwayhi - Gold and Base Metals

Al Amar - Gold and Base Metals

References

External links
Maaden Official Website.

1997 establishments in Saudi Arabia
Companies established in 1997
Mining companies of Saudi Arabia
Government-owned companies of Saudi Arabia
Companies based in Riyadh